Stay on My Side Tonight is a five-track EP released by American rock band Jimmy Eat World through downloads on September 13, 2005 and physically released on October 4, 2005. It consists of three unreleased songs, a cover of the Heatmiser song "Half Right", and a remix of the Futures track "Drugs or Me". The title of the album is taken from a line in the song "Disintegration", the EP's opening track.

Reception

Stay on My Side Tonight received a positive review from Tim Sendra of AllMusic, who praised the three outtakes as possibly better than Futures and with "more life and power than one might expect", but calling the other tracks "interesting but not vital". IGN's Chris Carle rated the release a 6.5 out of 10, with reverse preferences: he wrote that the remix is the best song on the EP and the first three tracks "glide by forgettably, awash in a sea of jangly, same-sounding guitar riffs".

Track listing
All songs written by Jimmy Eat World, except where noted.

"Disintegration" – 7:44
"Over" – 3:46
"Closer" – 5:51
"Half Right" (Heatmiser cover, written by Neil Gust and Elliott Smith) – 4:43
"Drugs or Me" (Styrofoam remix) – 5:15

Personnel
Jimmy Eat World
 Jim Adkins – lead vocals; lead guitar; engineering on "Disintegration", "Over", "Closer", and "Half Right"; production  on "Disintegration", "Over", and "Closer"; layout
 Rick Burch – bass guitar; backing vocals; production on "Disintegration", "Over", and "Closer"; layout
 Zach Lind – drums; production on "Disintegration", "Over", and "Closer"; layout
 Tom Linton – rhythm guitar; backing vocals; production on "Disintegration", "Over", and "Closer"; layout

Other personnel
Jason Cupp – assistant engineering on "Disintegration", "Over", and "Closer"
Chris Fudurich – mixing on "Disintegration", "Over", "Closer", and "Half Right"
Tony Hajjar – percussion on "Disintegration"
Dan Monick – photography
Mark Trombino – engineering and production on "Disintegration", "Over", and "Closer"; percussion on "Disintegration"
Roger Seibel – mastering
Styrofoam – remixing on "Drugs or Me"
Liam Ward – layout

Charts

References

External links

Stay on My Side Tonight at YouTube (streamed copy where licensed)

2005 EPs
Albums produced by Mark Trombino
Interscope Records EPs
Jimmy Eat World EPs